is a Japanese television drama series. It debuted on April 1, 1963, and was broadcast until April 4, 1964. It was the third Asadora series broadcast on NHK. It starred Shin Saburi as a college professor who quit his job to try to become a painter.

Cast
 Shin Saburi as Shōnosuke Sada
 Michiko Araki as Toshiko Sada, Shōnosuke's wife
 Nobuo Tsukamoto as Shōzō Sada, Shōnosuke's eldest son
 Keiko Iida as Ayako Sada, Shōnosuke's eldest daughter
 Yoko Kawaguchi as Yoko Sada, Shōnosuke's second daughter
 Eiko Muramatsu as Chizu Sada
 Hisano Yamaoka as Akiko
 Kyûzô Kawabe as Nojima
 Ayako Hōshō as the Director's wife
 Minako Osanai as Hisako
 Jun Usami as Ōnishi

References

1963 Japanese television series debuts
Asadora